In accounting the term Debtor Collection Period indicates the average time taken to collect trade debts. In other words, a reducing period of time is an indicator of increasing efficiency. It enables the enterprise to compare the real collection period with the granted/theoretical credit period. 
 
 Debtor Collection Period =  ×  
 (average debtors = debtors at the beginning of the year + debtors at the end of the year, divided by 2 or Debtors + Bills Receivables)
 
The Average Collection Period (ACP) is the time taken by businesses to convert their Accounts Receivables (AR) to cash. 
 
Credit Sales are all sales made on credit (i.e. excluding cash sales) A long debtors collection period is an indication of slow or late payments by debtors.
 
The multiplier may be changed to 12 (for months) or 52 (for weeks) if appropriate.

See also
Receivables turnover ratio
Cash flow
Debtor days
Working capital

References

Financial ratios
Working capital management